Reseda Charter High School (RCHS), established in 1955, is located in the Reseda section of the San Fernando Valley region of Los Angeles, California, United States. In the fall of 2018, the school became a charter and is now Reseda Charter High School. In the fall of 2020, the school added middle grades becoming a 6-12. It is in the Los Angeles Unified School District. Reseda Charter is one of the "Best High Schools in America" and one of the "Best Magnet Schools In America" according to U.S. News & World Report. The school's Police Academy Magnet and Science Magnet were named a national Magnet School of Distinction by the Magnet Schools of America in 2017, 2018, and 2019. As of July 2017, the school was issued a full six-year term of accreditation by the Western Association of Schools and Colleges' accreditation process.

The charter school is now home to Charter Academy 6-12 with enrollment by charter lottery and automatically for former residential boundary students, an International Dual Language Center (Spanish) 6-12, a School for Advanced Studies 6-12: PLTW Biomedical Science CTE pathway 9-12, the Arts, Media & Entertainment 9-12 Magnet: Film Production and Management Magnet 9-12, the Police Academy Magnet 9-12, and the Reseda High School Science Magnet 9-12: PLTW Biomedical Science & PLTW Engineering Magnet.

Reseda Charter High School is in the planning stages of a 180+ million dollar renovation. New buildings will include administration, library, auditorium, Regent Hall (cafeteria), kitchen and food service and two classroom buildings which will replace three industrial arts buildings. The new administration building will house administration, counseling, three magnet offices (AMEM, PA, Science), campus security, school police, college counseling, parent center, nursing and psychological services.

History
Reseda Charter High was the first complete high school to be built in the San Fernando Valley after World War II.  Reseda opened with complete academic and science buildings, gymnasium, track & field, Industrial shops, including an automotive repair facility. Reseda High School has a three-color system of navy, Columbia blue, and white.  It was one of few high schools in the San Fernando Valley to have a complete auditorium when it was built.

It was in the Los Angeles City High School District until 1961, when it merged into LAUSD.

Academic programs
Reseda Charter programs include Charter Academy residential school 6-8 & 9-12, an International Dual Language Center 6-8 & 9-12(Spanish), a School for Advanced Studies 6-8 & 9-12: PLTW Biomedical Science CTE pathway, the Arts, Media & Entertainment Magnet: Film Production and Management CTE Magnet, the Police Academy Magnet CTE Magnet, and the Reseda High School Science Magnet: PLTW Biomedical Science CTE and PLTW Engineering CTE Magnet an award-winning arts program including: animation, marching band, dance, graphic art, jazz band, orchestra, stagecraft, studio art, and theater arts  Academic Decathlon program, Navy Junior Reserve Officers' Training Corps, chapter of Health Occupations Students of America, Science Bowl. In addition, Reseda Charter has a competitive flag and drill team performing and competing with the marching band. The Reseda Charter Marching Brigade won 1st place in the LAUSD Band Competition in 2019 and 1st place in the 2019 Granada Hills Christmas Parade. Additionally in 2019, Reseda opened a professional dance CTE pathway led by a working professional dancer.

Reseda Charter has the only robotics program in the San Fernando Valley competing in the FIRST Robotics Competition and was in the 1st place alliance in the spring of 2018 in Pomona, CA.

Sports 
Reseda Charter fields teams for boys & girls in football, basketball, cheerleading, soccer, baseball, softball, volleyball, tennis, golf, track & field, cross country, water polo, swimming & wrestling. The teams have won CIF Championships in sports including football, basketball, track & field, soccer, volleyball, cross country and tennis.

Football

In 2019, the Reseda Charter High School football team were the 2019 CIF LA City D-1 Champions, CIF State 5A South Regional Champions. Previously, Reseda boasted championship titles in 1987,1995 City Champions 1998, and in 2016 were City Finalists. Overall, the Reseda football team won league championships in 1959, 1964, 1966, 1980, 1983, 1984, 1986, 1987, 1993,1995, 2010, 2011 and 2019 seasons for three different leagues. The Regents were 2-A CIF champions in 1986, 3-A champions in 1995, 5-A South Regional Champions in 2019.

Reseda's football field is dedicated to former head coach Joel Shaeffer, who died in early January 2013. Schaeffer coached the Regents from 1976 to 2000, in which the team won 6 league titles and 2 CIF championships. The team's current head coach, Alonso Arreola, took over the team in the 2005 season and won consecutive league championship titles in the 2010 and 2011 seasons led by quarterback Kwamhe Davis.

Reseda Charter Science Magnet 
The Reseda Science Magnet provides students with a strong background in science, math and social responsibility/community service. The program prepares students to be successful at the college level in the fields of medicine, physics, chemistry, engineering, geology and environmental science. Students develop a strong competency in both math and science.

Students are offered two pathways: PLTW biomedical or PLTW engineering option.

School shooting 
On February 22, 1993, 15-year-old Robert Heard shot and killed 17-year-old Michael Shean Ensley in a corridor of Reseda High School. Although police declined to characterize the shooting as gang-related, they did say both boys were involved in tagging. Ensley was the younger brother of actress Niecy Nash. Heard was convicted as a juvenile for his crime. In 2017, Heard was charged with second-degree murder for stabbing his wife to death in 2012 during his parole and faced up to life without parole.

The murder prompted LAUSD to install hundreds of metal detectors throughout the school district and a California State Assembly bill was passed allocating $1.5 million to buy metal wanding devices for all secondary schools in the state.

Notable alumni
 Robert Hilburn (1957), former Los Angeles Times music critic
 Dan Peña (1963) Wall Street as a financial analyst
 Christine Maggiore, deceased AIDS denialist
 Jeff "Swampy" Marsh (1978), animator, writer, director, producer, voice actor, and composer. Co-creator of Phineas & Ferb and Milo Murphy's Law
 Jim McGlothlin (1961), former MLB pitcher
 Odis McKinney (1974), former NFL cornerback
 Mark Nordquist (1963), former NFL lineman
 Bobby Pfeil, former MLB third baseman
 Leo Rosales (1999), former MLB pitcher
 Willie Sims, professional soccer player
 Brody Stevens, stand-up comedian and actor
 Bob Swaim (1961), film director
 Michael Tigar, criminal defense lawyer
 David Wilson, former NFL defensive back
 Hal Bedsole (1959), former NFL tight end
 Bob Christiansen, former NFL defensive tackle
 Greg Lee (1971), former ABA and NBA point guard
 Caroline Menjivar, California state senator

References

Further reading
Recalde, Tony (coordinator at Reseda Environmental / Physical Sciences Magnet High School). "Reseda High School Can House Gifted Program." Los Angeles Times. February 4, 1996.

External links

 Official site

High schools in the San Fernando Valley
Los Angeles Unified School District schools
High schools in Los Angeles
Educational institutions established in 1955
Public high schools in California
Magnet schools in California
Reseda, Los Angeles
1955 establishments in California